Ponerorchis yueana (synonym Amitostigma yueanum) is a species of plant in the family Orchidaceae. It is endemic to China, known only from Sichuan and Yunnan. It produces pink or white flowers. The epithet is also spelt "yuana".

Taxonomy
, there are discrepancies in the spelling of the specific epithet. The  World Checklist of Selected Plant Families and the International Plant Names Index spell it "yueanum", noting that the original description used the form "yüanum". The Flora of China and the authors who moved it to the genus Ponerorchis spell it "yuanum". Other sources are divided between these two spellings.

The species was first described in 1912 by Tsin Tang and Fa Tsuan Wang, as Amitostigma yueanum. A molecular phylogenetic study in 2014, in which this species was included, found that species of Amitostigma, Neottianthe and Ponerorchis were mixed together in a single clade, making none of the three genera monophyletic as then circumscribed. Amitostigma and Neottianthe were subsumed into Ponerorchis, with this species becoming Ponerorchis yueana.

References 

yueana
Endemic orchids of China
Endangered plants
Orchids of Yunnan
Plants described in 1940